German submarine U-214, was a Type VIID mine-laying U-boat of Nazi Germany's Kriegsmarine during World War II.

Laid down on 5 October 1940 by Germaniawerft in Kiel, the boat was commissioned  on 1 November 1941 with Kapitänleutnant Günther Reeder (Crew 35) in command. She trained with the 5th U-boat Flotilla from 1 November 1941 until 30 April 1942, and was then assigned to the 9th U-boat Flotilla from 1 May 1942. She was sunk on 26 July 1944 by a British warship.

The wreck of U-214 was found by the archaeologist Innes McCartney in 2006 at the location reported by the Allies after the war.

Design
As one of the six German Type VIID submarines, U-214 had a displacement of  when at the surface and  while submerged. She had two shafts and two  propellers.

U-14 was fitted with five  torpedo tubes (four fitted at the bow and one at the stern), twelve torpedoes, one  SK C/35 naval gun, 220 rounds, and an anti-aircraft gun, in addition to five mine tubes with fifteen SMA mines. The boat had a complement of between forty-four.

Service history

First and second patrol
U-214 sailed from Kiel on 18 May 1942, arriving at Kristiansand in Norway on the 20th. She sailed the next day, heading for Brest in France. On 22 May while in the North Sea, she was attacked by an aircraft, and slightly damaged by three bombs. The U-boat arrived at Lorient, also in France, on 2 June, and sailed to Brest the next day.

Her second patrol began on 13 June, but on 16 June at 03:44, she was strafed, three depth charges were also dropped by a Leigh light-equipped aircraft in the Bay of Biscay. A second attack was fought off with her flak defenses, but the U-boat sustained damage which forced her to return to Lorient on 17 June.

Third patrol
Not until her third patrol did U-214 score a victory. On 9 August 1942 she sailed from Brest, and on 18 August attacked Convoy SL-118, west of Portugal, sinking the 6,318 GRT Dutch cargo ship Balingkar and the 7,522 GRT British cargo ship Hatarana. She also damaged the armed merchant cruiser . She returned to Brest on 9 October after 62 days at sea.

Fourth and fifth patrols
The U-boat returned to her homeport on 24 February 1943 after a voyage of 87 days.

U-214s fifth patrol was cut short when she was attacked on 7 May 1943 by a British Halifax bomber of 58 Squadron RAF in the Bay of Biscay, after only three days at sea. The U-boat crash-dived, suffering only minor damage, but her commander Kptlt. Günther Reeder was severely wounded, resulting in first Officer Oberleutnant zur See Rupprecht Stock (Crew IV/37) bringing the U-boat safely back to base.

Sixth patrol
Now under Stock's command, U-214 sailed from Brest on 18 May 1943, and headed for the coast of West Africa. After abandoning ship, she was later re-boarded by her crew and towed to Dakar for repairs. The U-boat arrived back at Brest on 26 June.

Seventh patrol
U-214s seventh patrol took her to the waters off Panama. The aircraft approached by radar and dropped four depth charges, but was damaged in the air intake and the bomb bay by the U-boat's flak. One depth charge hit the U-boat, but bounced off and exploded without damaging her.

On 8 October, five miles off Colón, U-214 laid a field of 15 mines. One of these may have sunk the United States Navy submarine  on or about 14 October. On 12 October, the boat was attacked twice, but not damaged, by an aircraft of US Navy Patrol Squadron 210. U-214 returned home on 30 November after 101 days at sea.

Eighth and ninth patrol
U-214s next patrol, from 12 February – 29 April 1944, took her south to the west African coast, but without success. The U-boat was then fitted with a schnorkel before returning to active service. U-214 headed north into the shallow waters of the English Channel on 11 June, under the command of the newly promoted Kapitänleutnant Stock, however she had no successes, and the patrol was curtailed after the U-boat was attacked by a British B-24 Liberator of 224 Squadron, sustaining damage which forced her to return to Brest on 2 July.

Tenth patrol and loss
U-214 sailed from Brest on 22 July 1944 under the command of 21-year-old Oblt.z.S. Gerhard Conrad (Crew XII/39), one of the youngest U-boat commanders of World War II. All 48 hands were lost.

Wolfpacks
U-214 took part in two wolfpacks, namely:
 Blücher (14 – 28 August 1942) 
 Iltis (6 – 23 September 1942)

Summary of raiding history

References

Notes

Citations

Bibliography

External links

1941 ships
German Type VIID submarines
Ships built in Kiel
Ships lost with all hands
U-boats commissioned in 1941
U-boats sunk by depth charges
U-boats sunk by British warships
U-boats sunk in 1944
World War II shipwrecks in the Atlantic Ocean
World War II submarines of Germany
Maritime incidents in July 1944